The cantons of Vitry-sur-Seine are administrative divisions of the Val-de-Marne department, Île-de-France region, northern France. Since the French canton reorganisation which came into effect in March 2015, the city of Vitry-sur-Seine is subdivided into 2 cantons. Their seat is in Vitry-sur-Seine.

Population

References

Cantons of Val-de-Marne